YTA may refer to:
Pembroke Airport, Ontario, Canada with IATA code YTA
Youth Taking Action 
YTA TV, an American television network formerly known as Youtoo America